The Richmondshire Concerts take place in Richmond, North Yorkshire. The society (officially Richmondshire Subscription Concerts) was founded in 1947 by Tom Carr, and is a registered charity. The society attracts concert-goers from across a very wide area, including North Yorkshire, Teesside and County Durham.

The society puts on an average of six classical chamber-music concerts a year at the Influence Church, a converted cinema, on Wednesday evenings from September to April. The society has 261 subscribers who pay £48 a head (2019-20 season) for a season ticket. Tickets for individual events are available online or at the door.

Performers in the last 20 years have included Northern Sinfonia and the Sorrel Quartet, Belcea Quartet, Allegri Quartet, Maggini Quartet, Carducci Quartet, Benyounes Quartet, Doric Quartet, Escher Quartet, Brodsky Quartet, Barbirolli Quartet and Prazak Quartet.

References

External links
 Richmondshire Concerts

Richmondshire
Richmond, North Yorkshire
Organizations established in 1947
Chamber music
Music organisations based in the United Kingdom